The St. Francis of Assisi Cathedral also called Catholic Cathedral of Rhodes, is a Roman Catholic church located in the city of Rhodes, Greece, near the gate of St. Athanasius, between the two districts Acandia and St. John. The church is the cathedral of the Roman Catholic Archdiocese of Rhodes.

On September 20, 1936 the first stone was laid in the presence of Archbishop Giovanni Castellani and the Italian governor of the Dodecanese, Mario Lago. The works for the construction of the church, designed by architect Armando Bernabiti, ended in 1939. In 1940 the church was equipped with an organ and enriched with 14 terracotta bas-reliefs depicting the Stations of the Cross, the sculptor Monteleone.

The frescoes on the walls of the choir were painted by Pietro Gaudenzi. On the ceiling above the central altar, a cross rises, around which symbols of the four evangelists are arranged symmetrically. Gaudenzi also are the paintings on the side altars representing, respectively, the Annunciation and St. Maurice.

See also
Roman Catholicism in Greece
St. Francis of Assisi

References

Francis of Assisi
Buildings and structures in Rhodes (city)
Roman Catholic churches completed in 1939
20th-century Roman Catholic church buildings in Greece
Dodecanese under Italian rule